The Sacramento Southern Railroad is a heritage railroad owned by the California State Railroad Museum which operates excursion trains on it. The railroad extends from the museum property located in Old Sacramento south along the east bank of the Sacramento River levee.

The original Sacramento Southern Railroad ran south  to Walnut Grove, California via Freeport and was a non-operating subsidiary of the Southern Pacific Company incorporated in 1903.

The line was constructed between 1906–1912, and the first train began operating over the line in 1909.  It was merged in 1912 with the Central Pacific Railroad upon completion of the line to Walnut Grove.  The line was extended to Isleton by 1929.  In 1931, a  extension of the branch reached the Mokelumne River.

The railroad later became a part of the SP system who filed with the Interstate Commerce Commission to abandon the line, and did so on October 10, 1978. Around that time the California State Railroad Museum started acquiring the rail property, and started excursions in 1982.  Recent years have seen a resurgence in the road's freight business, serving a number of local industries via an interchange with the Union Pacific Railroad. Future plans call for expanding operations southward into the Sacramento River Delta area.

See also

 List of heritage railroads in the United States
 Sacramento RiverTrain—which operates excursions across the Sacramento River from the SSRR

References

External links

Heritage railroads in California
Historic American Engineering Record in California
Defunct California railroads
Predecessors of the Southern Pacific Transportation Company
Railway companies established in 1903
Railway companies disestablished in 1912
Transportation in Sacramento County, California
Tourist attractions in Sacramento County, California